The Beast Must Die is a 2021 British thriller television series based on the novel of the same name by Nicholas Blake, adapted for television by Gaby Chiappe. It centers on a mother's grief for her son who was killed in car accident. She takes matters into her own hands by posing as a novelist to ingratiate herself into the family of the man whom she believed to be responsible for her son's death.

Premise
Following the death of her son in a hit and run, all Frances Cairnes wants is to hunt down and kill the man she believes is responsible. When she finally tracks him down, she tricks her way into his house and plots his murder from within.

Cast and characters

Main 
 Billy Howle as Nigel Strangeways

Series 1 
 Cush Jumbo as Frances Cairnes
 Nathaniel Parker as Blount
 Maeve Dermody as Violet
 Douggie McMeekin as Vincent O'Brien
 Mia Tomlinson as Lena
 Geraldine James as Joy
 Jared Harris as George Rattery
 Barney Sayburn as Phil Rattery
 William Llande as Martie Cairnes

Episodes

Production

Development

Casting

Filmed on the Isle of Wight.

Release
The miniseries premiered on May 27, 2021, on BritBox. It aired on AMC+ on July 5, 2021, and on AMC on July 12, 2021.

Reception

The Beast Must Die has received positive reviews from critics. On Rotten Tomatoes, the series holds an approval rating of 85% based on 20 critic reviews, with an average rating of 7.48/10. The website's critical consensus reads, "Cush Jumbo and Jared Harris make for thrilling combatants in The Beast Must Die, a coiled potboiler that excels with deft performances and rich atmosphere." On Metacritic, it has a score of 73 out of 100 based on 9 critics, indicating "Generally favorable".

References

External links
 

BritBox original programming
English-language television shows
2020s British drama television series
2021 British television series debuts
2020s British crime drama television series
Television series by Scott Free Productions